Bander is both a given name and a surname. Notable people with the name include:

Bander Abdulrahman Al-Mohanna, Saudi Group Chief Executive Officer and Managing Director of NAS Air (Flynas)
Peter Bander van Duren (1930–2004), British writer on heraldry and orders of knighthood
Bander Nasser (born 1990), Saudi professional footballer

See also
Band (disambiguation)
Bandar (disambiguation)
Bandera (disambiguation)
Banderas (disambiguation)
Bhander